Darby Joseph Hendrickson (born August 28, 1972) is an American former professional ice hockey center. He played in the NHL with the Toronto Maple Leafs, New York Islanders, Vancouver Canucks, Minnesota Wild and the Colorado Avalanche, and is currently an assistant coach with the Minnesota Wild.

Playing career
He was drafted in the fourth round, seventy-third overall, by the Toronto Maple Leafs in the 1990 NHL Entry Draft. After being named Minnesota Mr. Hockey in 1991 for his play at Richfield Senior High School, Hendrickson entered the University of Minnesota. He played for two seasons with the Golden Gophers before joining Toronto's American Hockey League affiliate, the St. John's Maple Leafs, in the 1993–94 season.  After playing on the United States hockey team in the 1994 Winter Olympics, he made his NHL debut with Toronto during the 1994 Stanley Cup Playoffs, appearing in two games.

Other than a brief move to the New York Islanders during the 1995–96 season, Hendrickson remained with the Maple Leafs until midway through the 1998–99 season, when he was traded to the Vancouver Canucks in exchange for Chris McAllister on February 16, 1999. The Canucks left him unprotected in the 2000 NHL Expansion Draft, and he was selected by the Minnesota Wild. After three-plus seasons with the Wild, Hendrickson was traded during the 2003–04 season on February 25, 2004, along with an 8th round draft pick (Brandon Yip), to the Colorado Avalanche in exchange for a fourth round pick, which in turn was traded to the Ottawa Senators (who used the pick to select Cody Bass) in exchange for center Todd White.

During 2004–05 NHL lockout Hendrickson, as a friend of Sergei Zholtok, played seven games in Latvian hockey league club HK Riga 2000, but after the death of Zholtok he left the club. Hendrickson spent two seasons from 2005–07 playing for EC Salzburg in the Austrian EBEL before retiring.
 
Hendrickson worked as a Wild commentator for FSN North, and on March 27, 2008, he was named Northwest Divisional Representative by the NHLPA.

Career statistics

Regular season and playoffs

International

Awards and honors

References

External links

1972 births
Living people
American expatriate ice hockey players in Austria
American expatriate ice hockey players in Latvia
American men's ice hockey centers
Colorado Avalanche players
Houston Aeros (1994–2013) players
Ice hockey players from Minnesota
Ice hockey players at the 1994 Winter Olympics
Minnesota Golden Gophers men's ice hockey players
Minnesota Wild coaches
Minnesota Wild players
New York Islanders players
Olympic ice hockey players of the United States
People from Richfield, Minnesota
EC Red Bull Salzburg players
HK Riga 2000 players
St. John's Maple Leafs players
Syracuse Crunch players
Toronto Maple Leafs draft picks
Toronto Maple Leafs players
Vancouver Canucks players